Sinko may refer to:

Sinko, Guinea
Sinko, Senegal